Radical 107 or radical skin meaning "skin" or "hide" is one of the 23 Kangxi radicals (214 radicals in total) composed of 5 strokes.

In the Kangxi Dictionary, there are 94 characters (out of 49,030) to be found under this radical.

 is also the 119th indexing component in the Table of Indexing Chinese Character Components predominantly adopted by Simplified Chinese dictionaries published in mainland China.

Evolution

Derived characters

Literature

External links

Unihan Database - U+76AE

107
119